The 2022 Route d'Occitanie (known as the La Route d'Occitanie - La Dépêche du Midi for sponsorship reasons) is a road cycling stage race that took place between 16 and 19 June 2022 in the southern French region of Occitanie. The race is the 46th edition of the Route d'Occitanie and is rated as a category 2.1 event on the 2022 UCI Europe Tour.

Teams 
Nine UCI WorldTeams, seven UCI ProTeams, and five UCI Continental made up the twenty-one teams that participated in the race.

UCI WorldTeams

 
 
 
 
 
 
 
 
 

UCI ProTeams

 
 
 
 
 
 
 

UCI Continental Teams

Route

Stages

Stage 1 
16 June 2022 – Séméac to L'Isle-Jourdain,

Stage 2 
17 June 2022 – Graulhet Belmont-sur-Rance to Roquefort-sur-Soulzon,

Stage 3 
18 June 2022 – Sigean to Les Angles,

Stage 4 
19 June 2022 – Les Angles to Auterive,

Classification leadership table

Classification standings

General classification

Points classification

Mountains classification

Young rider classification

Team classification

Notes

References

External links 
 

2022 UCI Europe Tour
2022 in French sport
June 2022 sports events in France